MAMC may refer to:

Madigan Army Medical Center, by Tacoma, Washington, USA
Maharaja Agrasen Medical College, Agroha, medical college in Agroha, India
Manila Adventist College, Christian tertiary health sciences institution in Manila, Philippines 
Maulana Azad Medical College, government medical college in Delhi, India
Monsters Ate My Condo, video game
Musée d'art moderne et contemporain de Saint-Étienne, museum in Saint-Étienne, France
Myanmar Army Medical Corps, corps that provides medical services to Myanmar army personnel and their families